Moscowin Kavery is a 2010 Tamil romantic drama film written and directed by cinematographer Ravi Varman, making his directorial debut, besides handling the cinematography. The film, which has lyrics written by Vairamuthu and music scored by Thaman, stars Rahul Ravindran and Samantha Ruth Prabhu in the lead roles with Harsha Vardhan, Santhanam and Seeman playing supporting roles. Samantha Ruth Prabhu made her debut in Tamil Cinema with this movie. Releasing on 27 August 2010, after nearly three years of production, the film was panned by critics and was a disaster commercially.

Plot 

Moscow (Rahul Ravindran) and Kaveri (Samantha Ruth Prabhu) are two IT professionals working in Chennai. Kaveri has abandoned her family in her hometown due to family disputes and the violence that followed. Moscow is an orphan who has ancestral properties in his native village. Both fall in love, buy a house and live together. Soon, they have differences of opinions and plan to part ways. Then comes Azhagan (Harsha Vardhan), a most feared criminal on the police's wanted list. Azhagan comes across the couple's house and plans to murder them. But due to the timely intervention of the police, Azhagan is arrested and Moscow and Kaveri reunite. Kaveri also patches up with her estranged father (K. Selva Bharathy) and family members.

Cast

Development 
Ravi Varman wrote a script in 2006 for which he wanted to cast new actors in the lead. Ravi saw some modelling photos of Samantha and quickly said that she would be the heroine of the movie. He also signed Rahul Ravindran as hero of the film.

Soundtrack 

Film score and the soundtrack are composed by Thaman. Despite being Thaman's first Tamil assignment as a composer, several of his later films had released prior to the release of Moscowin Kavery. The tune of the song "Gore Gore" was reused from the song named the same from the 2009 Telugu movie Kick.

All lyrics written by Vairamuthu.

References

External links 
 

2010 films
2010s Tamil-language films
Films scored by Thaman S
2010 romantic drama films
Indian romantic drama films
2010 directorial debut films